Jacquinia is a genus of evergreen shrubs and trees in the family Primulaceae, native to Central America and the Caribbean.

The genus was established by Linnaeus in 1760 and named by him in honor of Nikolaus Joseph von Jacquin.

Species
There are about 86 species. IPNI.

External links
 See also images of Jacquinia on Diversity of Life

Primulaceae
Primulaceae genera